Dobbins Stadium is a baseball stadium in Davis, California. 

It is the home field of the UC Davis Aggies baseball team. The stadium holds 3,500 spectators and opened in 1986.

See also
 List of NCAA Division I baseball venues

References

External links
Venue information

Baseball venues in California
University of California, Davis campus
College baseball venues in the United States
Sports venues in Yolo County, California
UC Davis Aggies baseball